The 2nd TCA Awards were presented by the Television Critics Association. The ceremony was held on June 10, 1986, at the Beverly Wilshire Hotel in Los Angeles, Calif.

Winners and nominees

Multiple wins 
The following shows received multiple wins:

Multiple nominations 
The following shows received multiple nominations:

References

External links
Official website
1986 TCA Awards at IMDb.com

1986 television awards
1986 in American television
TCA Awards ceremonies